Kukawa (previously Kuka) is a town and Local Government Area in the northeastern Nigerian state of Borno, close to Lake Chad.

The town was founded in 1814 as capital of the Kanem-Bornu Empire by the Muslim scholar and warlord Muhammad al-Amin al-Kanemi after the fall of the previous capital, Ngazargamu. The town had great strategical importance, being one of the southern terminals of trans-Saharan trade routes to Tripoli.

The town was visited by German explorer Heinrich Barth in 1851 who arrived from Tripoli seeking to open trade with Europe and explore Africa, and again in 1892 by the French explorer Parfait-Louis Monteil, who was checking the borders between areas of West Africa assigned to the French and the British.
The town was captured and sacked in 1893 by the Sudanese warlord Rabih az-Zubayr, and then by the British in 1902.
 
Historically the city was much larger than today, with a population estimated by the British at 50,000-60,000 in the late nineteenth-century.

Towns in the Kukawa Local Government Area include Cross Kauwa and Baga, but there is no place called Kukawa apart from the local government area.

It is one of the sixteen LGAs that constitute the Borno Emirate, a traditional state located in Borno State, Nigeria.

On 16 January 2015, "caretaker chairman of Kukawa Local Government Area, Musa Alhaji Bukar Kukawa", speaking on behalf of the Kukawa residents who were displaced to Maiduguri following the 2015 Baga massacre, "called on the federal government to intensify military operations so that they can return to their homes." A massacre occurred in Kukawa in July 2015.

Hundreds of Kukawa citizens were held hostage by the Islamic State West Africa Province (ISWAP) in August 2020. Two million people in Borno have been displaced from their homes over the past ten years; many live in squalid conditions in Maiduguri.

References

Populated places in Borno State
Local Government Areas in Borno State
Bornu Empire